Blessed Beatrix d'Ornacieux (Beatrice of Ornacieux) (c. 1240–1306/09) was a Carthusian nun. Her feast day is 13 February.

Beatrice was a Carthusian nun who founded a settlement of the order at Eymieux in the department of Drôme. According to her Vita, written by Marguerite of Oingt, she was especially devoted to the Passion of Christ and is said to have driven a nail through her left hand to help herself to realize the sufferings of the Crucifixion.

Her cultus was confirmed by Pius IX in 1869. (See "Anal. jur. pont.", 1869, XI, 264.) There are modern lives by Bellanger and Chapuis and a full account in Lecoulteux, "Ann. Ord. Cath." (V, 5). Her feast is on 13 February.

References

External links
"Saint of the Day, February 13": Blessed Beatrix d'Ornacieux at SaintPatrickDC.org
/Sito sull'universo certosino

Year of birth missing
Ornacieux, Beatrice
Ornacieux, Beatrice
Ornacieux, Beatrice
13th-century French nuns
14th-century French nuns